Jean-Marc Gibeau is a politician in Montreal, Quebec, Canada. He served on the Montréal-Nord city council from 1996 to 2001 and on the Montreal city council from 2002 to 2017.

Early life and private career
Gibeau has a college diploma from the Cégep Marie-Victorin in arts and letters (1976) and a diploma of the Association des courtiers d'assurances de la province de Québec (English: Insurance Brokers' Association of the Province of Quebec) from the Collège de Maisonneuve (1978). He has been employed with Les Assurances Gibeau Inc. since 1978 and has been its president since 1990.

He currently serves on the board of governors of the École nationale de police du Québec.

Montréal-Nord city councillor
Gibeau was elected to the Montréal-Nord city council in a 1996 by-election, succeeding his father Réal Gibeau. He was re-elected in the 1998 municipal election.

Montreal city councillor
All municipalities on the Island of Montreal, including Montréal-Nord, were amalgamated into a single city on January 1, 2002. Gibeau was elected to the Montreal city council as a candidate of Gérald Tremblay's Montreal Island Citizens Union (MICU) in the anticipatory 2001 Montreal municipal election, winning one of three seats in the Montréal-Nord borough. Tremblay won the mayoral election, MICU won a majority of seats on council, and Gibeau served on council as a supporter of Tremblay's administration. He was re-elected in 2005 and 2009, on the latter occasion for Tremblay's renamed Union Montreal party.

Gibeau resigned from Union Montreal on May 3, 2013, after serious allegations of corruption were made about the party at the Charbonneau Commission. The following month, he joined Équipe Denis Coderre pour Montréal. He was Denis Coderre's co-listed candidate in the 2013 election and continued to serve on council when the Coderre/Gibeau ticket was elected in Gibeau's ward and Coderre was simultaneously elected as mayor.

Gibeau was appointed as president of the Équipe Denis Coderre caucus following the election. He was also appointed as an associate member of the Montreal executive committee (i.e., the municipal cabinet) with responsibility for resident services and worked in conjunction with Anie Samson, the councillor responsible for the file.

By virtue of holding his seat on city council, Gibeau was automatically a member of the Montréal-Nord borough council from 2002 to 2017. He also served as one of the two members of the Ville-Marie borough council directly appointed by the mayor of Montreal from 2013 to 2017.

Electoral record

References

Living people
Montreal city councillors
People from Montréal-Nord
Year of birth missing (living people)